Morpho rhodopteron is a Neotropical butterfly known only from the Sierra Nevada de Santa Marta in Colombia.

With a wingspan of 7.5 cm (3 in). It is the smallest species in the genus Morpho.

References
Godman, Du Cane F. and Salvin, O. (1880) A List of Diurnal Lepidoptera collected in the Sierra Nevada of Santa Marta, Colombia, and the Vicinity Transactions of the Entomological Society of London Volume 28: 119–154.
Le Moult, E. & Réal, P. (1962–1963) Les Morpho d'Amérique du Sud et Centrale Editions du cabinet entomologique E. Le Moult, Paris.

External links
Butterflies of America, Images of type
"Morpho Fabricius, 1807" at Markku Savela's Lepidoptera and Some Other Life Forms

Morpho
Nymphalidae of South America
Butterflies described in 1880
Endemic fauna of Colombia
Taxa named by Frederick DuCane Godman
Taxa named by Osbert Salvin